Carignan is a suburban municipality in southwestern Quebec, Canada, on the Richelieu River in La Vallée-du-Richelieu Regional County Municipality, about  from Montreal. The population as of the Canada 2021 Census was 11,740.

Carignan was originally the Village Municipality of Chambly. The village of Chambly was established in 1855, less than 10 years after the municipality of Chambly. In 1965 it was renamed Carignan to honour the Carignan-Salières Regiment.

Geography

Carignan is made up of small urban blocks surrounded by agricultural land where the main crops grown are corn, wheat and soybeans. The municipality borders the Acadia and Richelieu rivers and these merge, creating a small delta. At their tip, one of the city's four islands: Île Goyer (formerly Grande Isle since it is the largest). Also, Île Demers and Île Aux Lièvres Between the islands, there are channels containing unique flora and fauna. Unusual fact, the municipality is cut (to the east and west) by the city of Chambly in two non-contiguous portions: there is a discontinuity of 1.8 km on the chemin de la Grande-Ligne and 3 km by the Richelieu River.

History

The current city of Carignan was created on July 1, 1855 on a territory known as Chambly. The original name of Carignan was Saint-Joseph-de-Chambly and it kept this name for more than a century. On June 6, 1871, a large part of Saint-Joseph-de-Chambly broke apart (as well as an important section of Saint-Bruno-de-Montarville) to form the new town of Saint-Basile-le-Grand. Finally, on December 31, 1965, the name Saint-Joseph-de-Chambly was changed to become the new city of Carignan.

Demographics 

Population trend:

Mother tongue language (2021)

Transportation
The CIT Chambly-Richelieu-Carignan provides commuter and local bus services.

See also
 South Shore (Montreal)
 Montérégie, an administrative region of Quebec
 Île aux Lièvres (Richelieu River)
 Goyer Island
 Demers Island
 Chambly Basin
 L'Acadie River
 List of cities in Quebec

References

External links
Carignan official website

Cities and towns in Quebec
Greater Montreal
Incorporated places in La Vallée-du-Richelieu Regional County Municipality
Populated places established in 1855
1855 establishments in Canada